1 SWASpes was part of the South West African Territorial Force.

History
The South West African Territorial Force Command identified an urgent need for horse mounted and motorbike mounted units and dogs for the operational areas.  

The conclusions reached was for a unit organisation such as 202 Battalion to be adjusted so as to accommodate horse and dog units for operational use, and specifically, the urgent need for the acquisition of two platoons of mounted infantry. This included the furnishing of horses and equine related equipment, as well as the training and appointing of a qualified platoon commanding officer, full-time veterinarian and farriers. 

The Equestrian Centre became involved in the first purpose built frontline horse and motorcycle mounted infantry base in the Operational Area. 

By 1978, 1 SWASpes had diversified into the application of motorcycles, trackers and later the introduction of tracking and explosives detection dogs. 1 SWASpes was among the first to combine conventional infantry forces on the ground with the skills of trackers, the abilities of dogs and the quick reaction abilities afforded by horses and motorcycle units. 

Equestrian platoons were detached to bases across the Operational Area, though the main equestrian unit in South West Africa was stationed at Oshivelo.  

1 SWASpes introduced to counter insurgency, the application of the Packhound; using dogs to track, run down, and corner quarry for infantry or mounted soldiers to interdict. These packs could keep a speed of 15 km for over four hours, peaking at 30 km for 15 minutes.

Organization
By 1978, it comprised two companies of mounted infantry, two platoons of trackers and two platoons of motorcyclists, and a force of 60 dogs.

Roll of honour
 Colling, H.  Rifleman 1980
 Beyleveld, M. Rifleman 1984
 Briggs, R.P. Corporal 1984
 Brindle, R.O. Rifeman 1981
 Dossenno Paul, Sergeant, 1977
 Devereaux, S.V.P. Rifleman, 1977
 Jordaan, H.K. Wrn 1981
 Mostert, A.D. Lance Corporal 1983
 Roos, D.N. Corporal 1979
 Mostert, E.C. Rifleman 1983
 Ross, T.A. Rifleman, 1983
 Venter, P.J. Wrn, 1981
 Swanepoel, P. Lance Corporal 1981
 Barth, A.C. Corporal 1984

See also
 Namibian War of Independence
 South African Border War

References

Further reading
Helmoed-Romer Heitman (Author), Paul Hannon (Illustrator), Modern African Wars (3): South-West Africa (Men-At-Arms Series, 242),  Osprey Publishing (November 28, 1991) 

Military history of Namibia
Military units and formations of the Cold War
Military units and formations of South Africa
Military units and formations of South Africa in the Border War
Military units and formations established in 1977
Military units and formations disestablished in 1977